Andrei Mureșanu (November 16, 1816 in Bistrița – October 12, 1863 in Brașov) was a Romanian poet and revolutionary of Transylvania.

Born in a family of a small business owner in the countryside, he studied philosophy and theology in Blaj. In 1838 he started working as a professor in Brașov. He published his first poetry in the magazine Foaie pentru minte, inimă și literatură (Paper for mind, heart and literature). He was one of the leading figures of the 1848 revolution in Transylvania, taking part in the Brașov delegation at the Blaj Assembly in May 1848. His poem Deșteaptă-te, române!, composition based on a popular tune of an old religious anthem, became the hymn of the revolutionaries. Nicolae Bălcescu named it "La Marseillaise of Romanians" for its ability to mobilize the people to fight. The poem later became the national anthem of Romania in 1990.

After the revolution, Mureșanu worked as a translator in Sibiu, had some patriotical works published in the Telegraful Român magazine. In 1862 his poetry was gathered in a single volume. Due to poor health conditions, he died in 1863 at Brașov. He is buried in the city’s Groaveri cemetery.

Notes

References
Mureșanu, Andrei, 1816-1863.  / Andrei Mureșanu ; . Selections. 1988 București : Editura Minerva, 1988. 248 p. ; 20 cm.
Vasile Oltean - , Ed. Salco, Brașov, 2005, 
Pann, Anton, 1796 or 7-1854.  / [versurile de Andrei Mureșanu ; muzica de Anton Pann]. [Romania] : Editura Muzicală, [1990?] 1 score (16 p.) ; 29 cm.

External links
Encyclopedia of 1848 Revolutions: Andrei Muresianu

People from Bistrița
Romanian people in the Principality of Transylvania (1711–1867)
People of the Revolutions of 1848
Romanian revolutionaries
Romanian poets
Romanian male poets
Romanian Greek-Catholics
1816 births
1863 deaths
National anthem writers
Burials at Groaveri cemetery

Eastern Catholic poets